The Hounslow Chronicle is a local weekly tabloid newspaper distributed in west London, England. It mainly covers stories from the London Borough of Hounslow. It was founded as The County of Middlesex Chronicle in 1859.

References

External links
Hounslow Chronicle

London newspapers
Media and communications in the London Borough of Hounslow
Newspapers established in 1859
1859 establishments in England